Killingbeck Island is a small island lying east of Rothera Point, off the southeast coast of Adelaide Island, Antarctica. It was named by the UK Antarctic Place-Names Committee in 1964 for John B. Killingbeck, a British Antarctic Survey glaciologist in 1960–63.

See also 
 List of Antarctic and sub-Antarctic islands

References

Islands of Adelaide Island